MacDonald "Scooter" Mukasi (born 26 May 1975 in Boksburg) is a former South African football player who played as a forward.

Career
He played for a few clubs, including Jomo Cosmos, Paralimni, CSKA Sofia, Lokomotiv Sofia, and Manning Rangers. He then moved to India and joined East Bengal Club of Kolkata for the 2007–08 I-League season. Well-travelled former Bafana Bafana winger MacDonald 'Scooter' Mukasi has completed his move to Premiership rookies Bay United on a one-year deal after impressing during recent trials.

International career
He played for the South Africa national football team and was a participant at the 2002 FIFA World Cup.

References

1975 births
Living people
Association football forwards
South African soccer players
South African expatriate soccer players
South Africa international soccer players
Jomo Cosmos F.C. players
Enosis Neon Paralimni FC players
FC Lokomotiv 1929 Sofia players
PFC CSKA Sofia players
SuperSport United F.C. players
Pierikos F.C. players
East Bengal Club players
2002 FIFA World Cup players
First Professional Football League (Bulgaria) players
Cypriot First Division players
Expatriate footballers in Cyprus
Expatriate footballers in Bulgaria
Expatriate footballers in Russia
Expatriate footballers in India
People from Boksburg
FC SKA-Khabarovsk players
Manning Rangers F.C. players
Bay United F.C. players
Sportspeople from Gauteng
Calcutta Football League players